Tommaso di Piero Trombetto (1464–1529) was an Italian painter of the city of Prato. He is considered as a follower of the style of Filippo Lippi.

References

Italian Renaissance painters
Painters from Tuscany
15th-century Italian painters
Italian male painters
16th-century Italian painters
1464 births
1529 deaths